Andrew Brandon Craig (born January 15, 1986) is an American mixed martial artist who most recently competed in the Welterweight division of the Ultimate Fighting Championship. A professional competitor since 2010, he has also competed for Bellator.

Background
Craig is from Houston, Texas, and grew up playing mainly football, but dabbled with a bunch of other sports too. He started football in the third grade, and played as running back. He graduated Stratford High School (Houston) before going to college at the University of Texas where he earned a degree in corporate communications. Craig began learning Brazilian jiu-jitsu from his cousin – Travis Tooke – who was already a black belt in the martial art. Without any other martial art background, Craig started training mixed martial arts as a college freshman. After graduating college, Craig began his career as a professional MMA fighter.

Mixed martial arts career

Early career
Craig made his professional debut in May 2010 for USA MMA winning his first fight via unanimous decision. His second fight was held at Bellator 27 against Rodrigo Pinheiro. Craig won the fight after the cageside doctor ruled Pinheiro unable to continue. Craig won two fights under the International Xtreme Fight Association banner before signing with the Texas-based promotion Legacy Fighting Championships.

Legacy Fighting Championships
Craig made his Legacy Fighting Championships debut on April 9, 2011, against William Bush for the Legacy Fighting middleweight title. In the fifth and final round, Craig won the fight via TKO.

Craig was set to make his first title defense at Legacy Fighting 8 against Bellator and WEC veteran, Eric Schambari. However, Schambari weighed in past the middleweight limit and the fight became a three round non-title fight. Craig won the fight via unanimous decision.

Ultimate Fighting Championship
Craig made his UFC debut on short notice as an injury replacement for Jared Hamman against Australian Kyle Noke on March 3, 2012, at UFC on FX 2. Despite losing the first round, Craig came back to dominate the second and third rounds, winning via unanimous decision.

Craig defeated Rafael Natal on July 11, 2012, at UFC on Fuel TV: Munoz vs. Weidman. After being rocked and controlled for the majority of the second round, Craig landed a head kick to capture a comeback knockout victory.

In his third fight for the promotion, Craig faced Ronny Markes on January 19, 2013, at UFC on FX 7. He lost the fight via unanimous decision. It was the first loss of his professional career.

Craig defeated former WEC Middleweight Champion Chris Leben via split decision on July 6, 2013, at UFC 162.

Craig took on English fighter Luke Barnatt in his next outing on October 26, 2013, at UFC Fight Night 30. He lost the fight via submission in the second round. Despite the loss on his record, the fight also earned Craig his first Fight of the Night bonus award.

Craig was expected to face Chris Camozzi on April 11, 2014, at UFC Fight Night 39.  However, the fight was cancelled on the day of the weigh-ins as Craig was ruled out with an illness.

Craig faced Cezar Ferreira on June 28, 2014, at UFC Fight Night: Swanson vs. Stephens. He lost the fight via unanimous decision.

Craig was expected to face Edgar Garcia in a welterweight bout on July 15, 2015, at UFC Fight Night 71.  However, Garcia was forced from the bout with injury and replaced by promotional newcomer Lyman Good.  Craig lost the fight via TKO in the second round and was subsequently released from the promotion following the loss.

Personal life
Craig works as a manager at Onnit.

Championships and accomplishments
Legacy Fighting Championship
Legacy FC Middleweight Championship (One time)
Ultimate Fighting Championship
Fight of the Night (One time) vs. Luke Barnatt

Mixed martial arts record

|-
|Loss
|align=center|9–4
|Lyman Good
|KO (punches)
|UFC Fight Night: Mir vs. Duffee
|
|align=center|2
|align=center|3:37
|San Diego, California, United States
|
|-
| Loss
|align=center| 9–3
| Cezar Ferreira
| Decision (unanimous)
| UFC Fight Night: Swanson vs. Stephens
| 
|align=center| 3
|align=center| 5:00
|San Antonio, Texas, United States
|
|-
| Loss
|align=center| 9–2
| Luke Barnatt
| Submission (rear-naked choke)
| UFC Fight Night: Machida vs. Munoz
| 
|align=center| 2
|align=center| 2:12
|Manchester, England
|
|-
| Win
|align=center| 9–1
| Chris Leben
| Decision (split)
| UFC 162
| 
|align=center| 3
|align=center| 5:00
|Las Vegas, Nevada, United States
| 
|-
| Loss
|align=center| 8–1 
| Ronny Markes
| Decision (unanimous)
| UFC on FX: Belfort vs. Bisping
| 
|align=center| 3
|align=center| 5:00
|São Paulo, Brazil
| 
|-
| Win
|align=center| 8–0 
| Rafael Natal
| KO (head kick)
| UFC on Fuel TV: Munoz vs. Weidman
| 
|align=center| 2
|align=center| 4:52
|San Jose, California, United States
| 
|-
| Win
|align=center| 7–0
| Kyle Noke
| Decision (unanimous) 
| UFC on FX: Alves vs. Kampmann
| 
|align=center| 3
|align=center| 5:00
|Sydney, Australia
| 
|-
| Win
|align=center| 6–0
| Eric Schambari
| Decision (unanimous)
| Legacy FC 8
| 
|align=center| 3
|align=center| 5:00
|Houston, Texas, United States
|
|-
| Win
|align=center| 5–0
| William Bush
| TKO (punches)
| Legacy FC 6
| 
|align=center| 5
|align=center| 2:47
|Houston, Texas, United States
|
|-
| Win
|align=center| 4–0
| Jon Kirk
| Submission (triangle choke)
| IXFA 5
| 
|align=center| 2
|align=center| 1:04
|Houston, Texas, United States
| 
|-
| Win
|align=center| 3–0
| Josh Foster
| Decision (unanimous)
| IXFA 4
| 
|align=center| 3
|align=center| 3:00
|Houston, Texas, United States
| 
|-
| Win
|align=center| 2–0
| Rodrigo Pinheiro
| TKO (doctor stoppage)
| Bellator 27
| 
|align=center| 3
|align=center| 2:53
|San Antonio, Texas, United States
| 
|-
| Win
|align=center| 1–0
| Antuan Williams
| Decision (unanimous)
| USA MMA 12
| 
|align=center| 3
|align=center| 5:00
|Kinder, Louisiana, United States
| 
|}

See also
 List of current UFC fighters
 List of male mixed martial artists

References

External links
 
 
 
 
 Instructor Page

1986 births
Living people
American male mixed martial artists
Mixed martial artists from Texas
Middleweight mixed martial artists
Welterweight mixed martial artists
Mixed martial artists utilizing Brazilian jiu-jitsu
Ultimate Fighting Championship male fighters
American practitioners of Brazilian jiu-jitsu
People awarded a black belt in Brazilian jiu-jitsu
Sportspeople from Houston
Moody College of Communication alumni